Sir Edward Phelips (c. 1555/15601614) was an English lawyer and politician, the Speaker of the English House of Commons from 1604 until 1611, and subsequently Master of the Rolls from 1611 until his death in 1614. He was an elected MP from 1584, and in 1588, following a successful career as a lawyer, he commissioned Montacute House to be built as a Summer house for himself and his family. He was knighted in 1603 and one of his major roles was as the opening prosecutor during the trial of the Gunpowder Plotters.

He married Margaret Newdigate, and his son, Sir Robert Phelips, inherited his land and property.

Life
He was fourth and youngest son of Thomas Phelips (1500–1588) of Montacute, Somerset, by his wife Elizabeth (d. 1598), daughter of John Smythe of Long Ashton in the same county. His father stood godfather to Thomas Coryate. Edward was born about 1560: according to Coryate, who refers to him as a patron, he was about 53 in 1613.

He joined the Middle Temple, where he was autumn reader in 1596. In 1584 he entered parliament as MP for Bere Alston, followed by terms as MP for Weymouth and Melcombe Regis in 1586, Penryn in 1593 and Andover in 1597. In 1601 he was elected knight of the shire for Somerset. On 11 February 1603 he was named serjeant-at-law, but Queen Elizabeth died, and he did not proceed to his degree until the following reign. On 17 May he was made king's serjeant and knighted. In November he took part in the trial of Sir Walter Raleigh. He was re-elected to parliament for Somerset on 11 February 1604, and on 19 March was elected speaker. According to Sir Julius Cæsar, he was the best speaker for some decades, and although long-winded, did expedite some business for the king.

On 17 July 1604 he was granted the office of justice of common pleas in the county palatine of Lancaster. In this capacity he was very active against Catholics; he is said to have declared that, as the law stood, all who were present when mass was celebrated were guilty of felony. He was one of those appointed to examine the Gunpowder Plot conspirators, and in January 1606 opened the indictment against Guy Fawkes. He was also chancellor to Henry Frederick, Prince of Wales. On 2 December 1608 he was granted the reversion of the Master of the Rolls, but did not succeed to the office until January 1611. 

In 1613 he was involved in the celebrations at the wedding of Princess Elizabeth and Frederick V of the Palatinate. He helped organise The Memorable Masque of the Middle Temple and Lincoln's Inn and paid Inigo Jones £110 for the scenery and stage-works. he was appointed ranger of all royal forests, parks, and chases in England.

Besides his London house in Chancery Lane, and another at Wanstead, Essex, where he entertained the king, Phelips built a large mansion in Somerset, Montacute House, which is still standing, and in the possession of the National Trust. He died on 11 September 1614, having married, firstly, Margaret (d. 28 April 1590), daughter of Robert Newdegate of Newdegate, Surrey, by whom he had two sons, Sir Robert and Francis; secondly, Elizabeth (d. 26 March 1638), daughter of Thomas Pigott of Doddershall House, Buckinghamshire.

Parliamentary convention

It was under Phelips that the "1604 rule" was established: a parliamentary convention that "no motion can be put by the Government to the Commons twice in the same parliamentary session if the wording is exactly or substantially the same." The rule was invoked 12 times between 1604–1920; and was also invoked in 2019 in relation to the Brexit withdrawal agreement.

References

Attribution

|-

|-

16th-century births
1614 deaths
Speakers of the House of Commons of England
Masters of the Rolls
Year of birth uncertain
Knights Bachelor
English MPs 1584–1585
English MPs 1586–1587
English MPs 1589
English MPs 1593
English MPs 1597–1598
English MPs 1601
English MPs 1604–1611
Members of the Parliament of England for Bere Alston